James Powers may refer to:

 J. F. Powers (James Farl Powers, 1917–1999), American novelist and short-story writer
 James Legrand Powers (1871–1927), founder of Powers Accounting Machine Company
 James Powers (New York politician) (1785–1868), New York politician
 James E. Powers (born 1931), New York politician
 James F. Powers (1938–2012), New Hampshire politician
 James T. Powers (actor) (1862–1943), American stage actor, vocalist, and lyricist
 James Patrick Powers (born 1953), American Roman Catholic bishop
 Jimmy Powers (~1903-1995), sportswriter for the New York Daily News and commentator on Boxing on NBC

See also 
 James Power (disambiguation) (Powers family name frequently confused with Power family name)
 Jim Powers (disambiguation), lists people with the name Jim Powers
 Powers (disambiguation) for a list of other uses of "Powers," including other people with the last name Powers